Miriama Bono (born 9 July 1977) is an architect and painter from French Polynesia, who is Director of the Musée de Tahiti et des Îles.

Biography 
Bono was born on 9 July 1977 in Papeete. She studied for her baccalaureate at Lycée Paul-Gauguin, after which she moved to Paris to join the National School of Architecture of Paris-La Villette. She graduated in March 2002. Following graduation she returned to her French Polynesia to work as a consulting architect for the government, she then joined the Ministry of the Environment, where she held the positions of Chief of Staff and as Communications Officer until 2004, the beginning of political instability in the territory. In 2004 she returned to France and focussed on her artistic practice, developing her style and exhibiting work in Europe and the Pacific, in places such as Strasbourg, Paris, Ajaccio and Nouméa.

In 2008, Bono moved back to French Polynesia and directed the Artists' Workshop of the Hotel Le Méridien in Punaauia, as well as organizing several artistic events. Her knowledge of the art world and skill in event management led Wallès Kotra and Heremoana Maamaatuaiahutapu, founding fathers of the Tahiti International Documentary Film Festival, to employ her in 2012. In 2016 she became President of the Pacific International Documentary Film Festival Association. The same year she joined the Ministry of Culture and the Environment, as technical advisor in charge of communication and culture and the promotion of Polynesian languages. In particular, she was responsible for commissioning studies for the creation of a new cultural centre for French Polynesia.

In 2017 Bono was appointed as Director of the Musée de Tahiti et des Îles, with her architectural background considered particularly suitable for carrying out the establishment's major renovation projects. Bono has been instrumental in commissioning the renovation of the museum, as well as securing a number of international loans that return significant objects of Polynesian culture to the museum. In September 2019 the Director of the Musée du quai Branly, Emmanuel Kasarhérou, and the Minister for Culture in Polynesia, Heremoana Maamaatuaiahutapu, and Bono signed an agreement to ensure the return to Tahiti of the Maro'ura - a fragment of a chiefly belt made of tapa, that was born by chiefs and is considered a sacred object.

Towards the end of 2019, she launched the first Polynesian-language podcast, devoted to art and creativity in French Polynesia. In March 2020, during the first Polynesian lockdown, she launched a second podcast, devoted to Polynesian myths and legends.

Awards 
In 2018, she was elevated to the rank of Chevalier de l' Ordre national du Mérite.

References

External links 

 Miriama Bono, Présidente de l’AFIFO
 Invitée café : Miriama Bonno

Living people
1977 births
People from Papeete
Directors of museums in France
French Polynesian women
French curators
French architects
French women artists
French women architects